NCTE may refer to:
 The National Center for Transgender Equality
 The US-based National Council of Teachers of English
 The National Centre for Technology in Education, a defunct Irish Government agency
 National College of Textile Engineering, now known as the National Textile University, in Faisalabad, Pakistan
 National Council for Teacher Education, the top government of India body regulating institutions providing education in teacher training in India.